(literally, Autumn Sun Park) is a public park in the Hikarigaoka region of Nerima, Tokyo, Japan.

Overview
The park is located in a corner of the Hikarigaoka housing complex, and is the only park with rice paddies in Nerima Ward. It was created to remind people that the area was once a place where paddy fields existed.

The paddy fields have an area of about 500 square metres, and glutinous rice is grown there. In order to have children experience rice cultivation, elementary school students in the neighborhood also participate in planting rice fields and harvesting rice.

At the entrance of the park, there is a gate that resembles that of an old farmhouse.

A flea market is also regularly held in the park.

Access
 By train: About 15 minutes’ walk from Hikarigaoka Station on the Toei Ōedo Line

See also
 Parks and gardens in Tokyo
 National Parks of Japan

References

 Website of Nerima City (in Japanese)

External links
 Website of Nerima Tourism (in Japanese)
Parks and gardens in Tokyo